Clash of the Elements Is the third studio album of Swedish metal band The Poodles, released 20 May 2009. It was the first album with new guitarist Henrik Bergqvist, who replaced Pontus Norgren after he quit the band to play with Hammerfall.

Track listing

Personnel
 Jakob Samuel - lead vocals
 Pontus Egberg - bass guitar, backing vocals
 Christian Lundqvist - drums
 Henrik Bergqvist - guitars

Charts

Weekly charts

Year-end charts

External links
Official website
German The Poodles Fanpage

References

2009 albums
The Poodles albums